Forgive Her may refer to:

Forgive Her (Swallow the Sun song)
"Forgive Her", song by Gregory Isaacs from Rat Patrol 2001

See also
"Forgive Her Anything", song by Elvis Costello from Mighty Like a Rose 1991